Remillard or Rémillard may refer to
 Remillard (surname)
Ashworth-Remillard House, a historic farm house in San Jose, California, US
Centre scolaire Léo-Rémillard, a French-language high school in Winnipeg, Manitoba, Canada